Dana Spálenská (born 10 February 1950) is a Czechoslovakian luger who competed during the 1970s. She won the bronze medal at the 1975 FIL World Luge Championships in Hammarstrand, Sweden.

Spálenská also finished tenth in the women's singles event at the 1976 Winter Olympics in Innsbruck.

References
 Austrian Press Agency results on Top Ten of women's singles luge at the 1976 Winter Olympics in Innsbruck. – Accessed June 21, 2007 
 Hickok sports information on World champions in luge and skeleton.
 SportQuick.com information on World champions in luge 
 

Czechoslovak female lugers
Olympic lugers of Czechoslovakia
Lugers at the 1968 Winter Olympics
Lugers at the 1976 Winter Olympics
Living people
1950 births